Synchiropus atrilabiatus, the antler dragonet, is a species of fish in the family Callionymidae, the dragonets. It is found in the Eastern  Pacific Ocean.

References

atrilabiatus
Fish of the Pacific Ocean
Taxa named by Samuel Garman
Fish described in 1899